Estill County is a county located in the U.S. state of Kentucky. As of the 2020 census, the population was 14,163. Its county seat is Irvine The county was formed in 1808 and named for Captain James Estill, a Kentucky militia officer who was killed in the Battle of Little Mountain during the American Revolutionary War. Estill County is a moist county meaning that the county seat, the city of Irvine, allows the sale of alcohol after the October 9, 2013 vote, but not the rest of Estill County outside the Irvine city limits. Estill County has two adjacent towns, known as the twin cities, Irvine and Ravenna. Both cities sit along the Kentucky River in the central part of the county. Ravenna is home to a former CSX Transportation facility, now owned by Kentucky Steam Heritage Corporation for the restoration of Chesapeake and Ohio 2716. It conducts the Ravenna Railroad Festival annually in late summer, and the historic Fitchburg & Cottage Furnaces are located here. Irvine hosts the annual Mountain Mushroom Festival over the last weekend of April, which celebrates the abundant Morel Mushrooms found in the region.

History
Estill County was formed in 1808 from land given by Clark and Madison counties, it was Kentucky's 50th county. Originally settled by European settlers entering Kentucky via old buffalo and Indian trails and traveling through Boonesborough in what is today Madison County.

Estill County was one of the first areas in the United States to experience early industrialization, with iron mining and smelting beginning in 1810. The iron industry would go on to thrive in Estill County for decades, with the ruins of the Estill furnace, the Cottage furnace, and the Fitchburg Furnace still being visible today. The Fitchburg furnace was a particularly impressive engineering feat. Standing 81 feet tall, the furnace is the largest charcoal furnace in the world, and one of the largest 25 dry-stone masonry structures in the world. The iron industry declined after the Civil War when iron deposits and timber to fire the furnaces were depleted, and innovation made charcoal furnaces obsolete. During the Civil War Estill County was strongly pro-union, similar to surrounding counties, especially to the southeast.

Additionally, the county was historically known for the Estill Springs summer resort, situated near mineral springs in Irvine. This resort was a popular vacation site for many prominent Kentuckians in the 19th century, with men including Henry Clay, John Crittenden, and John C. Breckinridge vacationing there. The current courthouse, built in 1941, replaced a structure dating from the 1860s.

Geography
Estill County is located at the contact of two Kentucky regions: the Bluegrass and the Cumberland plateau, because of this the county is known as the location where the "Bluegrass kisses the Mountains."

Estill County contains two important rivers. With the Red River, famous for its gorge in neighboring Powell County, forming the northern border. And the Kentucky River bisecting the county. Much of Estill County's development, including the towns of Irvine and Ravenna, is located in the fertile bottomlands of the Kentucky River. Additionally, due to the Kentucky River's deep valley and Estill County's location at the edge of the Cumberland plateau the county's topography is striking. The Pottsville Escarpment is prominent in the county, marking the divide between the Bluegrass and the mountains. Because of this topography total relief is nearly 1000 feet in the county, with the highest point being Zion Mountain, located about  miles southwest of Irvine at 1,511 feet, and the lowest point being the confluence of the Kentucky River and the Red River at 566 feet. Other high points include Happy Top Mountain, 1,500 feet; Preacher Estes Mountain, 1,475 feet; Peter Mountain, 1,454 feet; Low Knob, 1,450 feet; and Big Round Mountain, Buzzard Roost, and McKinney Mountain, each at 1,420 feet.

Adjacent counties
 Clark County  (north)
 Powell County  (northeast)
 Lee County  (southeast)
 Jackson County  (south)
 Madison County  (west)

Protected areas
 Daniel Boone National Forest (part)
 Lilly Mountain Nature Preserve

Demographics

As of the census of 2000, there were 15,307 people, 6,108 households, and 4,434 families residing in the county. The racial makeup of the county was 99.07% White, 0.11% Black or African American, 0.24% Native American, 0.03% Asian, 0.06% from other races, and 0.49% from two or more races.  0.53% of the population were Hispanic or Latino of any race.

There were 6,108 households, out of which 32.30% had children under the age of 18 living with them, 55.40% were married couples living together, 12.90% had a female householder with no husband present, and 27.40% were non-families. 24.60% of all households were made up of individuals, and 10.70% had someone living alone who was 65 years of age or older.  The average household size was 2.48 and the average family size was 2.94.

In the county, the population was spread out, with 24.20% under the age of 18, 9.10% from 18 to 24, 29.20% from 25 to 44, 24.20% from 45 to 64, and 13.50% who were 65 years of age or older.  The median age was 37 years. For every 100 females there were 93.80 males.  For every 100 females age 18 and over, there were 91.20 males.

The median income for a household in the county was $23,318, and the median income for a family was $27,284. Males had a median income of $29,254 versus $18,849 for females. The per capita income for the county was $12,285.  About 22.50% of families and 26.40% of the population were below the poverty line, including 32.30% of those under age 18 and 21.50% of those age 65 or over.

Politics
Although it lies in the Bluegrass and Knobs regions, Estill County was more akin to the eastern Pennyroyal Plateau to its southwest in being strongly pro-Union during the Civil War. Indeed, a larger proportion of Estill County's population volunteered for the Union Army than the population of any free state, or of any Kentucky county except the famous Republican bastion of Owsley County. Consequently, Estill County has been strongly Republican ever since the end of Reconstruction – since 1888 the county has voted Democratic only for Woodrow Wilson in 1912, Franklin D. Roosevelt in 1932 and Lyndon Johnson in 1964, with the biggest of these three victories in 1932 being FDR's by a mere one hundred and eighty-seven votes out of over six thousand one hundred.

Communities

City
 Irvine (county seat)
 Ravenna

Other Communities
 Barnes Mountain
 Cobhill
 Cressy
 Crystal
 Drip Rock
 Fox
 Furnace
 Hargett
 Leighton
 Palmer
 Patsey
 Pryse
 Red Lick
 South Irvine
 Spout Springs
 Tipton Ridge
 Wisemantown
 Winston

See also

 National Register of Historic Places listings in Estill County, Kentucky

References

External links
 The Kentucky Highlands Project
 Estill County development authority's website
 Estill County Water District 1
 Estill County History & Ancestry

 
Kentucky counties
Counties of Appalachia
1808 establishments in Kentucky
Populated places established in 1808